A virtual human, virtual persona, or digital clone is the creation or re-creation of a human being in image and voice using computer-generated imagery and sound, that is often indistinguishable from the real actor.

The idea of a virtual actor was first portrayed in the 1981 film Looker, wherein models had their bodies scanned digitally to create 3D computer generated images of the models, and then animating said images for use in TV commercials. Two 1992 books used this concept: Fools by Pat Cadigan, and Et Tu, Babe by Mark Leyner.

In general, virtual humans employed in movies are known as synthespians, virtual actors, vactors, cyberstars, or "silicentric" actors. There are several legal ramifications for the digital cloning of human actors, relating to copyright and personality rights.  People who have already been digitally cloned as simulations include Bill Clinton, Marilyn Monroe, Fred Astaire, Ed Sullivan, Elvis Presley, Bruce Lee, Audrey Hepburn, Anna Marie Goddard, and George Burns.

By 2002, Arnold Schwarzenegger, Jim Carrey, Kate Mulgrew, Michelle Pfeiffer, Denzel Washington, Gillian Anderson, and David Duchovny had all had their heads laser scanned to create digital computer models thereof.

Early history
Early computer-generated animated faces include the 1985 film Tony de Peltrie and the music video for Mick Jagger's song "Hard Woman" (from She's the Boss).  The first actual human beings to be digitally duplicated were Marilyn Monroe and Humphrey Bogart in a March 1987 film "Rendez-vous in Montreal" created by Nadia Magnenat Thalmann and Daniel Thalmann for the 100th anniversary of the Engineering Institute of Canada.  The film was created by six people over a year, and had Monroe and Bogart meeting in a café in Montreal, Quebec, Canada.  The characters were rendered in three dimensions, and were capable of speaking, showing emotion, and shaking hands.

In 1987, the Kleiser-Walczak Construction Company (now Synthespian Studios), founded by Jeff Kleiser and Diana Walczak coined the term "synthespian" and began its Synthespian ("synthetic thespian") Project, with the aim of creating "life-like figures based on the digital animation of clay models".

In 1988, Tin Toy was the first entirely computer-generated movie to win an Academy Award (Best Animated Short Film).  In the same year, Mike the Talking Head, an animated head whose facial expression and head posture were controlled in real time by a puppeteer using a custom-built controller, was developed by Silicon Graphics, and performed live at SIGGRAPH.  In 1989, The Abyss, directed by James Cameron included a computer-generated face placed onto a watery pseudopod.

In 1991, Terminator 2: Judgment Day, also directed by Cameron, confident in the abilities of computer-generated effects from his experience with The Abyss, included a mixture of synthetic actors with live animation, including computer models of Robert Patrick's face.  The Abyss contained just one scene with photo-realistic computer graphics.  Terminator 2: Judgment Day contained over forty shots throughout the film.

In 1997, Industrial Light & Magic worked on creating a virtual actor that was a composite of the bodily parts of several real actors.

21st century
By the 21st century, virtual actors had become a reality.  The face of Brandon Lee, who had died partway through the shooting of The Crow in 1994, had been digitally superimposed over the top of a body-double in order to complete those parts of the movie that had yet to be filmed.  By 2001, three-dimensional computer-generated realistic humans had been used in Final Fantasy: The Spirits Within, and by 2004, a synthetic Laurence Olivier co-starred in Sky Captain and the World of Tomorrow.

Star Wars 
Since the mid-2010s, the Star Wars franchise has become particularly notable for its prominent usage of virtual actors, driven by a desire in recent entries to reuse characters that first appeared in the original trilogy during the late 1970s and early 1980s.

The 2016 Star Wars Anthology film Rogue One: A Star Wars Story is a direct prequel to the 1977 film Star Wars: A New Hope, with the ending scene of Rogue One leading almost immediately into the opening scene of A New Hope. As such, Rogue One necessitated digital recreations of Peter Cushing in the role Grand Moff Tarkin (played and voiced by Guy Henry), and Carrie Fisher as Princess Leia (played by Ingvild Deila), appearing the same as they did in A New Hope. Fisher's sole spoken line near the end of Rogue One was added using archival voice footage of her saying the word "hope". Cushing had died in 1994, while Fisher was not available to play Leia during production and died a few days after the film's release. Industrial Light & Magic created the special effects.

Similarly, the 2020 second season of The Mandalorian briefly featured a digital recreation of Mark Hamill's character Luke Skywalker (played by an uncredited body double and voiced by an audio deepfake recreation of Hamill's voice) as portrayed in the 1983 film Return of the Jedi. Canonically, The Mandalorian's storyline takes place roughly five years after the events of Return of the Jedi.

Legal issues
Critics such as Stuart Klawans in the New York Times expressed worry about the loss of "the very thing that art was supposedly preserving: our point of contact with the irreplaceable, finite person".  Even more problematic are the issues of copyright and personality rights. Actors have little legal control over a digital clone of themselves. In the United States, for instance, they must resort to database protection laws in order to exercise what control they have (The proposed Database and Collections of Information Misappropriation Act would strengthen such laws). An actor does not own the copyright on his or her digital clones, unless they were created by her or him. Robert Patrick, for example, would not have any legal control over the liquid metal digital clone of himself that was created for Terminator 2: Judgment Day.

The use of digital clones in movie industry, to replicate the acting performances of a cloned person, represents a controversial aspect of these implications, as it may cause real actors to land in fewer roles, and put them in disadvantage at contract negotiations, since a clone could always be used by the producers at potentially lower costs. It is also a career difficulty, since a clone could be used in roles that a real actor would not accept for various reasons. Both Tom Waits and Bette Midler have won actions for damages against people who employed their images in advertisements that they had refused to take part in themselves.

In the USA, the use of a digital clone in advertisements is required to be accurate and truthful (section 43(a) of the Lanham Act and which makes deliberate confusion unlawful). The use of a celebrity's image would be an implied endorsement.  The United States District Court for the Southern District of New York held that an advertisement employing a Woody Allen impersonator would violate the Act unless it contained a disclaimer stating that Allen did not endorse the product.

Other concerns include posthumous use of digital clones. Even before Brandon Lee was digitally reanimated, the California Senate drew up the Astaire Bill, in response to lobbying from Fred Astaire's widow and the Screen Actors Guild, who were seeking to restrict the use of digital clones of Astaire.  Movie studios opposed the legislation, and as of 2002 it had yet to be finalized and enacted. Several companies, including Virtual Celebrity Productions, have purchased the rights to create and use digital clones of various dead celebrities, such as Marlene Dietrich and Vincent Price.

In fiction
 S1m0ne, a 2002 science fiction drama film written, produced and directed by Andrew Niccol, starring Al Pacino where he created a computer-generated woman which he can easily animate to play the film's central character.
 The Congress, a 2013 science fiction drama film written, produced and directed by Ari Folman, starring Robin Wright deals with this issue extensively.
 In the Black Mirror episode "USS Callister," Callister Inc.'s CTO Robert Daly (portrayed by Jesse Plemons) uses the DNA samples he secretly obtains from discarded items used by his Callister Inc. co-workers to create sentient digital clones through his Digital Clone Replicator to be his crew member on the titular spaceship in his modded version of the MMORPG video game "Infinity" which Callister Inc. created.
 In Tokumei Sentai Go-Busters, the Metaloid Filmloid created evil clones of the Go-Busters. In Power Rangers Beast Morphers, they were adapted as the Evil Beast Morpher Ranger clones created by Filmloid's English adapted equivalent Gamertron.

See also
 Avatar (computing)
 Deepfake
 Digital cloning
 Live2D
 On-set virtual production
 Timeline of computer animation in film and television
 Timeline of CGI in film and television
 Uncanny valley
 Virtual band
 Virtual cinematography
 Virtual humans
 Virtual influencer
 Virtual newscaster
 Virtual YouTuber

References

Further reading
  — a detailed discussion of the law, as it stood in 1997, relating to virtual humans and the rights held over them by real humans
  — how trademark law affects digital clones of celebrities who have trademarked their personæ
 

3D computer graphics
Animated characters
Anatomical simulation